Jaysh al-Ummah al-Salafi fi Bayt al-Maqdis (Salafi Army of the Ummah in Jerusalem), also known as Jaysh al-Ummah fi Aknaf Bayt al-Maqdis or just Jaysh al-Ummah (Army of the Ummah), is a Gaza Strip-based Palestinian and Salafi jihadist militant organization. The group is supportive of al-Qaeda and critical of Hamas.

History 
Members of Jaysh al-Ummah have claimed that their group was founded in 2005. However, researchers have dated its beginning instead to 2007 or 2008. Since its foundation, the group has mostly focused on shooting rockets and other explosives into Israeli territory. In January 2008, the group announced that it planned to murder United States President George W. Bush. On 1 September 2008, the group organized its first "public training session" in southern Gaza, using the opportunity to criticize Gaza's Hamas government. Two days later, Hamas arrested Jaysh al-Ummah's leader Abu Hafs al-Maqdisi, prompting the group to threaten violent responses unless their commander was released. Afterwards, the two sides became generally hostile, with Jaysh al-Ummah ignoring any ceasefire agreements agreed upon between Hamas and Israel, while Hamas would repeatedly arrest Jaysh al-Ummah members. However, the two groups refrained from open fighting. Jaysh al-Ummah fought in the 2012 Gaza conflict and the 2014 Gaza War against Israel.

In 2019, the group claimed responsibility for an attack on Israel. It also claimed to have taken part in the 2021 Israel–Palestine crisis, shooting rockets at Israeli targets.

Organization 
The group is relatively small. It had at least 25 members in 2008. Jaysh al-Ummah is led by Abu Hafs al-Maqdisi. It tries to finance itself through online donations via Bitcoin.

Ideology 
The group has described itself as Salafi jihadist force that aims for the implementation of the Sharia law in all Muslim communities and "liberating Palestine" as well as the Al-Aqsa Mosque. Jaysh al-Ummah also expresses its hope that the Islamic caliphate is restored in the future. The group blames Jews for destroying the old caliphate, believing that they possess an innate "beastliness and barbarity". Accordingly, it is strongly anti-Israeli. Abu Hafs al-Maqdisi has claimed that the lack of a coherent vision among the Islamic ummah is the main reason for the failure to solve the "Palestinian case". He has argued that Muslims should unite to end the "Zionist-Crusader occupation" of Muslim countries, and blamed other Palestinian groups for having begun to serve "Western Zionist-Crusaders" and "Eastern Russian-Persian" projects instead of striving for the establishment of an Islamic state. It is critical of Iran's influence in the Gaza Strip.

Relations to other Islamist groups 
Jaysh al-Ummah supports al-Qaeda, though it is not officially affiliated with it. In contrast, Jaysh al-Ummah is opposed to the Islamic State in Iraq and the Levant (ISIL), and considers ISIL supporters "Khawarij". It has labelled ISIL a threat to the unity of jihadist factions in Gaza.

The group has a very tense relationship with Hamas. Since its foundation, Jaysh al-Ummah has criticized Hamas as being too moderate and not focused enough on Islamist projects. In turn, Hamas has repeatedly attempted to suppress Jaysh al-Ummah's activities. However, Jaysh al-Ummah has refrained from declaring Hamas un-Islamic, instead terming it a Muslim yet misguided movement. In regards to other Jihadist groups such as the Islamic Jihad Movement in Palestine, a member of Jaysh al-Ummah stated that the group "considers other Islamic movements to be brothers and respects and honours them".

References

Works cited

 

Gaza Strip
Jihadist groups in Palestine
Gaza–Israel conflict
Groups affiliated with al-Qaeda